Sainte-Honorine-des-Pertes is a former commune in the Calvados department in the Normandy region in northwestern France. On 1 January 2017, it was merged into the new commune Aure sur Mer.

History

World War II
On 13 September 1942 13 British commandos landed at night near Sainte-Honorine-des-Pertes from a Motor Torpedo Boat in Operation Aquatint, a reconnaissance mission to collect information about the surrounding area, and took a German guard prisoner.

Sainte-Honorine-des-Pertes is located at the eastern end of Omaha Beach, one of the landings sites on D-Day, 6 June 1944, at the beginning of the Battle of Normandy, during World War II.

Population

See also
Communes of the Calvados department
 History of the local ruined Saint Simeon chapel, with images

References

Former communes of Calvados (department)
Calvados communes articles needing translation from French Wikipedia